If I Ran the Circus is a children's book by Dr. Seuss, published in 1956 by Random House.

Like The Cat in the Hat, or the more political Yertle the Turtle, If I Ran the Circus develops a theme of cumulative fantasy leading to excess. The overt social commentary found in the Sneetches and the Zax demonstrates that Dr. Seuss was fascinated by the errors and excesses to which humans are prone, and If I Ran the Circus also examines this interest, though more subtly and comically, given its earlier genesis.

Plot overview
Behind Mr. Sneelock's ramshackle store, there's an empty lot. Little Morris McGurk is convinced that if he could just clear out the rusty cans, the dead tree, and the old cars, nothing would prevent him from using the lot for the amazing, world-beating, Circus McGurkus. The more elaborate Morris' dreams about the circus become, the more they depend on the sleepy-looking and innocent Sneelock, who stands outside his ramshackle store sucking on a pipe, oblivious to the fate that awaits him in the depths of Morris's imagination.

Sneelock does not yet know that he will have to dispense 500 gallons of lemonade, be lassoed by a Wily Walloo, wrestle a Grizzly-Ghastly, and ski down a slope dotted with giant cacti. But if his performance is up to McGurkian expectations, then "Why, ladies and gentlemen, youngsters and oldsters, your heads will quite likely spin right off your shouldsters!" Sneelock won't mind it one bit because he likes to help out. 

At the end of Morris's fantasy, Sneelock is casting a serious eye at him.

References

1956 children's books
Books by Dr. Seuss
American picture books
Circus books
Random House books